Q73 may refer to:
 Q73 (New York City bus)
 Al-Muzzammil, a surah of the Quran